Hans-Georg Beck FBA (18 February 1910 in Schneizlreuth, Bavaria, German Empire — 25 May 1999 in Munich) was a German scholar, specializing in Byzantine studies.

Biography 
He was born in Schneizlreuth, Bavaria in 1910. In 1929 he graduated from high school in Ettal. In 1930 he entered the Ludwig-Maximilian University, where in 1936 he defended his doctoral thesis in theology, "Vorhersehung und Vorherbestimmung in der theologischen Literatur der Byzantiner" (English: Providence and Predestination in Byzantine Theological Literature), which was published in Rome the following year as volume 114 of the Orientalia Christiana Analecta series. In 1949 he defended his habilitated work "Theodoros Metochites. Die Krise des byzantinischen Weltbildes im 14. Jahrhundert" (English: Theodoros Metochites: The Crisis of the Byzantine Worldview in the Fourteenth Century). This work was highly praised among scholars of Byzantine studies. He subsequently published about 10 books on the subject. He died on 25 May 1999 in Munich.

Awards 
Hans Georg Beck was a member of many national Academies of Sciences and scientific societies. In 1962 he became a full member of the Bavarian Academy of Sciences and chaired commissions on the publication of the "Corpus of Greek Acts" and on patristics. In 1966 he was elected a corresponding member of the Austrian Academy of Sciences, in 1975 he became a foreign member of the Athens Academy, in 1977 he was admitted to the British Academy (corresponding member) and the Royal Academies for Science and the Arts of Belgium, and in 1988 to the American Philosophical Society.

Books

References

German Byzantinists
Corresponding Fellows of the British Academy
Foreign Members of the Academy of Athens (modern)
Members of the Royal Academy of Belgium
Members of the American Philosophical Society
Corresponding Members of the Austrian Academy of Sciences
1910 births
1999 deaths